Iracema de Alencar (19 April 1900 – 17 March 1978) was a Brazilian actress. She made her debut as the lead in the 1917 silent film Iracema. After working in theatre for many years she appeared in several other films, much later in her career.

Selected filmography
 Iracema (1917)
 Brazil Year 2000 (1969)

References

Bibliography 
 Pick, Zuzana M.  The New Latin American Cinema: A Continental Project. University of Texas Press, 2010.

External links 
 

1900 births
1978 deaths
Brazilian film actresses
Brazilian stage actresses
20th-century Brazilian actresses